Frederick York St Leger was the Irish founder of the Cape Times newspaper in South Africa, and an Anglican priest.

Early life and family
He was born into an Anglo-Irish family in Limerick, Ireland, on 20 March 1833.

He married Christiana Emma Mudelle of Maidstone, Kent, England, in 1856, and they moved to South Africa, where they went on to have eight children, their eldest being Frederick Luke St Leger (1857 - 1938), another son Colonel Stratford Edward St Leger (1867-1935) was a member of the Royal Irish Regiment. His granddaughter was the artist and poet Joan St Leger Lindbergh.

Career
The Revd. F.Y. St. Leger served as headmaster at St. Andrew's College, Grahamstown, Eastern Cape, South Africa, from 1859 to 1862.

In 1873 and 74, he was an editor and journalist for the Diamond Field newspaper of Griqualand West.

In 1875, he was elected to the Legislative Assembly of the Parliament of the Cape of Good Hope, as one of the representatives for Cape Town.

He founded and edited the first issue of the Cape Times on 27 March 1876.

St. Leger died at Newlands, Cape Town, on 28 March 1901.

Notes and references

Further reading 

 
 

1833 births
1901 deaths
White South African people
Frederick York
Irish emigrants to South Africa
South African journalists
South African newspaper editors
Alumni of Corpus Christi College, Cambridge
People educated at St Paul's School, London